Voting to elect eight members of the Lebanese parliament took place in Chouf District on April 7, 1968, as part of the national general election of that year. Three of the seats of the constituency were earmarked for the Maronite community, two for the Sunni Muslim, two for the Druze whilst the last seat was allocated to the Greek Catholics (for more information about the Lebanese election system, see Elections in Lebanon). The Chouf District constituency had 78,557 eligible voters, out of whom 46,056 voted (the highest number of all constituencies in the country). All in all Chouf District was one of the most hotly contested constituencies in the election, being the home turf of Camille Chamoun and Kamal Jumblatt. The situation in the constituency was tense (the Jumblatt camp had warned of an armed uprising if Chamoun would have been declared the winner), but the polls went through without violent incidents. However, Jumblatt did accuse 'a large embassy in Beirut' (probably an allusion to the U.S. embassy) of buying votes for Chamoun.

Candidates
24 candidates took part in the election. The contest was mainly between the tickets headed by Chamoun and Jumblatt, with the candidates of the third list lagging far behind in gathering the votes of the local electorate. Camille Chamoun was the leader of the National Liberal Party and a former president of the republic. The Druze strongman Kamal Jumblatt was the leader of the Progressive Socialist Party and the National Struggle Front.

Maronite seats
Camille Chamoun sought re-election from the Chouf District. His Maronite running mates were Sami al-Bustani and Halim al-Ghafari. Al-Bustani was an incumbent parliamentarian from the National Liberal Party. Professionally he was an engineer. The lawyer al-Ghafari contested elections for the first time.

Jumblatt fielded three Maronites linked to the National Struggle Front, out of whom one (Aziz Awn) was an incumbent parliamentarian since 1960. The 65-year-old Awn was a physician by profession. The two other Maronite candidates of the National Struggle Front, Suleiman al-Bustani and Fu'ad at-Tahini, were lawyers by profession.

Sunni seats
Jumblatt's ticket featured the two incumbent Sunni Muslim parliamentarians from Chouf. The first Sunni Muslim candidate on the Jumblatt ticket was the Minister of Water and Electricity and longtime parliamentarian Anwar al-Khatib. His Sunni running mate was the former diplomat Muhammad al-Barjawi.

Chamoun's Sunni Muslim candidates were Issam al-Hajjar and Hassan al-Qa'qur. The 36-year-old lawyer al-Hajjar had been elected to parliament in the 1960 election, but then as a candidate of Kamal Jumblatt. Al-Qa'qur worked in the civil service, who had made a previous attempt to run for parliament in the 1964 election.

Druze seats
Kamal Jumblatt was a traditional Druze leader and landlord. At the time of the 1968 elections, he had only lost his parliamentary seat once. His Druze running mate was Bahij Taqiuddin, lawyer, former minister and incumbent parliamentarian linked to the National Struggle Front. Chamoun's two Druze candidates were the landlord Muhammad Arslan and the engineer Qathan Himadih (the latter was informally linked to the National Liberal Party).

Greek Catholic seat
The incumbent Greek Catholic parliamentarian was Joseph Mghabghab of the National Liberal Party. He ran as the Greek Catholic candidate on Chamoun's ticket. He was challenged by the former parliamentarian Salim Abd an-Nur from the Jumblatt ticket.

Results
Five candidates from the Jumblatt ticket and three candidates from the Chamoun ticket were elected.

See also

1971 Chouf parliamentary by-election

References

Chouf District
Chouf District